The Wagyl (also written Waugal and Waagal and variants) is the Noongar manifestation of the Rainbow Serpent in Australian Aboriginal mythology, from the culture based around the south-west of Western Australia. The Noongar describe the Wagyl as a snakelike Dreaming creature responsible for the creation of the Swan and Canning rivers and other waterways and landforms around present day Perth and the south-west of Western Australia.

The Wagyl created many local landscape features between the Porongarups and off the coast of Fremantle. The Wagyl was delegated to protect the rivers, lakes, springs and the wildlife, and Wagyl sacred sites tend to be natural sun-traps, located beside bodies of water. The Noongar people were appointed by the Wagyl as the guardians of the land, and the Wagyl was seen by certain tribal elders who spoke to the dreamtime being.

The Darling Scarp is said to represent the body of the Wagyl, which meandered over the land creating the curves and contours of the hills and gullies. The being is strongly associated with rivers, lakes like Lake Monger, and is supposed still to reside deep beneath springs. As the Wagyl slithered over the land, his track shaped the sand dunes, his body scoured out the course of the rivers; where he occasionally stopped for a rest, he created bays and lakes. Piles of rocks are said to be his droppings, and such sites are considered sacred.  As he moved, his scales scraped off and become the forests and woodlands of the region.

See also
Aboriginal mythology
Burlong Pool
Bibbulmun Track
Wirnpa

General references

Flannery, Tim  (2002) The Future Eaters: an Ecological History of the Australian Lands and People

References

Noongar culture
Australian Aboriginal deities
Australian Aboriginal legendary creatures
Creator deities
Rainbow serpent deities
Swan River (Western Australia)